Derriaghy, (also known as Derryaghy),, is a townland (of 538 acres) and  civil parish in County Antrim, Northern Ireland,  south-west of Belfast city centre. The townland is situated in the historic barony of Belfast Upper and the civil parish covers areas of both Belfast Upper and the barony of Massereene Upper.

History
The listed Christ Church Church of Ireland church in Derriaghy occupies the site of an early church. The earliest documentary reference to a church in Derriaghy is in a letter from Pope Innocent III in 1204. The Taxation of Down, Connor and Dromore of 1306-07 also mentions a church in Derriaghy. The records of an Inquisition in Antrim 1n 1605, indicate that the parish church of Dirreraghie was in some disrepair.

Churches
Christ Church Church of Ireland, listed building.
Derriaghy Gospel Hall
St. Patrick's Roman Catholic Church.

Transport
Derriaghy railway station was opened in 1907 and is between Dunmurry and Lambeg stations on the main Belfast-Dublin railway line.

Sport
Derriaghy Cricket Club plays in the NCU Senior League.
Derriaghy Cricket Club F.C. was founded in 1982 and plays in the Northern Amateur Football League.
Éire Óg Derriaghy GAC - a  Gaelic Athletic Association club founded in 1932 and comprises it's club membership from Derriaghy, Finaghy and Dunmurry.

People
Henrietta Gayer had John Wesley and other preachers to stay at her house here
Cosslett Ó Cuinn (1907-1995), Church of Ireland minister and poet, theologian, critic and biblical scholar, born in Derriaghy
Philip Skelton (1707-1787), Protestant clergyman and writer, born in Derriaghy

Civil parish of Derriaghy

Townlands
The civil parish contains the following townlands:

Aghalislone
Aghnahough
Ballycollin
Ballymacoss
Ballymacward Lower
Ballymacward Upper
Bovolcan
Clogher (Derriaghy)
Derryaghy
Drumankelly
Islandkelly
Killeaton
Kilmakee
Lagmore
Magheralave (Belfast Upper)
Magheralave (Massereene Upper)
Mullaghglass
Poleglass
Slievenacloy (Belfast Upper)
Slievenacloy (Massereene Upper)
Slievenagravery
Tornagrough
Tornaroy
White Mountain

See also 
List of townlands in County Antrim
List of civil parishes in County Antrim

References

Townlands of County Antrim